The boys' 2,000 metres steeplechase competition at the 2010 Youth Olympic Games was held on 18–23 August 2010 in Bishan Stadium.

Schedule

Results

Heats

Finals

Final B

Final A

External links
 iaaf.org - Men's 2000m steeplechase
 

Athletics at the 2010 Summer Youth Olympics